The 2013–2014 UCI Track Cycling World Cup was a multi race tournament over a track cycling season. It was the twenty-second series of the UCI Track Cycling World Cup organised by the Union Cycliste Internationale. The series ran from 1 November 2013 to 19 January 2014 and consisted of three rounds in Manchester, Aguascalientes and Guadalajara.

Series 
The 2013–2014 UCI Track Cycling World Cup consisted of three rounds, in Manchester (United Kingdom), Aguascalientes (Mexico) and Guadalajara (Mexico).

Manchester, United Kingdom 

The first round of the World Cup was hosted in Manchester. Manchester has hosted the World Cup on eight occasions. This round was held between 1 and 3 November 2013 at the Manchester Velodrome.

Aguascalientes, Mexico 
The second round of the World Cup was hosted in Aguascalientes. This round was held between 5 and 7 December 2013 at the Aguascalientes Bicentenary Velodrome.

Guadalajara, Mexico 
The third round of the World Cup will be hosted in Guadalajara. This round was held between 17 and 19 January 2014 at the Velodromo Panamericano.

Overall team standings
Overall team standings are calculated based on total number of points gained by the team's riders in each event. The top ten teams after the third and final round are listed below:

Results

Men

Women

References

External links

2013–2014 UCI Track Calendar, UCI
2013–2014 UCI Track Cycling World Cup – Events, UCI
Manchester Start Lists, Results and Analysis, Tissot Timing
Aguascalientes Start Lists, Results and Analysis, Tissot Timing
Guadalajara Start Lists, Results and Analysis, Tissot Timing

World Cup Classics
World Cup Classics
UCI Track Cycling World Cup